Rapala christopheri is a butterfly in the family Lycaenidae. It was described by David A. Lane and Chris J. Müller in 2006. It is endemic to East Timor.

References

External links

Rapala (butterfly)
Butterflies described in 2006